Mirta Aguirre Carreras (18 October 1912 – 8 August 1980) was a Cuban poet, novelist, journalist and political activist from the LGBTQI movement. She has been called "the most important female academic and woman of letters in post-revolutionary Cuba".

Life
Aguirre joined the Cuban Communist Party in 1932. She was a contributor to Juan Ramón Jiménez's 1936 anthology of Cuban poetry. In the early 1950s she was a regular contributor to the bi-monthly Mujeres cubana [Cuban Women]. Her poetry was influenced by the criollismo of Nicolás Guillen and García Lorca's idea of the 'Romancerero gitano', which Aguirre adapted to tell stories of revolutionary achievement.

Works
Presencia interior [Interior Presence], 1938
Influencia de la mujer en Iberoamerica [The Influence of Women In Latin America], 1948. Winner of the Iboamerican Floral Games.
 Juegos y otros poema, [Games and other poems], 1974
 "Juegos y otros Poemas," 1974
 "La Obra Narrativa de Cervantes," 1971, 1978
 Ayer de hoy [Yesterday of Today], 1980

References

External links
Mirta Aguirre, Oxford Encyclopaedia of Children's Literature

 Mirta Aguirre at cubaliteraria.cu

Cuban essayists
Cuban journalists
Cuban academics
1912 births
1980 deaths
Cuban women essayists
Cuban women novelists
Cuban women poets
Cuban women journalists
20th-century Cuban women writers
20th-century Cuban novelists
20th-century Cuban poets
20th-century essayists
20th-century journalists